Oolong is a locality in southern New South Wales, Australia and the location of a minor railway station on the Main South railway line.  It lies within the section from Gunning to Bowning which opened as a single line on 3 July, 1876. it is also located on the Hume Highway between Goulburn and Yass.

History 
The station and crossing loop opened on 25 November 1890. The platform, which was 33 metres long, was erected on 18 December, 1890.  When the line was duplicated, including deviations to the original alignment, in 1914, a new station building was erected on the deviation.  There was a siding, a crossover and a signal box on one of the platforms.

The platform closed on 13 February 1972, and was dismantled in the late 1980s.

Level crossing 
In 2006, a proposal surfaced to close the level crossing near the site of the old station.  Even though usage of the crossing was very small, perhaps 55 vehicles per day, there was outrage from the local community.

References

External links 
 Picture of Oolong railway station

Localities in New South Wales
Upper Lachlan Shire
Southern Tablelands
Main Southern railway line, New South Wales